Deliverance (née Hazeltine) Dane (January 15th, 1653 - June 15th 1735) was one of many women accused of witchcraft during the Salem Witch Trials. She was born January 15th, 1653, her parents were Robert and Anna Hazeltine. She was from Andover, Massachusetts, and due largely to the work of her father-in-law, much of the hysteria that swept through Salem was halted in Andover. 

Her husband, Nathaniel Dane, was the son of Rev. Francis Dane.  Francis Dane was outspoken against the trials, and his two daughters Abigail Faulkner and Elizabeth Johnson were also accused of being witches.  Abigail was convicted of witchcraft, but only escaped execution because she was pregnant at the time.

Many of the records of Deliverance's examination have been lost, but on page 280 of Marilynne K. Roach's book The Salem Witch Trials: A Day-by-Day Chronicle of a Community Under Siege, she quotes Deliverance as saying that she and some other witches had brought her father-in-law's specter along with them to torment the afflicted.  Her testimony was ignored and Rev. Francis Dane was not arrested. Deliverance Dane escaped execution. According to Andover, Massachusetts records, she died on June 15, 1735.

References

Sources

External links
  Virginia
  Salem Witch Trials
  Historical sketches of Andover: (comprising the present towns of North Andover and Andover)page 423

People convicted of witchcraft
People of the Salem witch trials
1735 deaths
1653 births